The Roosevelt School in Bernalillo, New Mexico was begun as a Federal Emergency Relief Administration project in 1935 and completed as a Works Progress Administration project in 1936.  It was listed on the National Register of Historic Places in 1996.

It is a one-story "Spanish-Pueblo Revival Style building" built with reinforced concrete structure.  Its walls are adobe brick covered by a cream-colored stucco.  It has a continuous parapet with projecting vigas.

References

External links

National Register of Historic Places in Sandoval County, New Mexico
Spanish Revival architecture in New Mexico
Pueblo Revival architecture in New Mexico
Buildings and structures completed in 1936